Mohammad Ali Khan may refer to:
Mohammad Ali Khan Zand (c. 1760 – 1779), second shah of the Zand dynasty
Mohammad-Ali Khan (sepahsalar), Iranian military and government official
Mohammad Ali Khan (cricketer) (born 1998), Pakistani cricketer
Mak Lind (born Mohammed Ali Khan, 1988), Lebanese-born Swedish footballer
Qaleh-ye Mohammad Ali Khan, a village in Iran
Mohammadabad, Shirvan, Iran, also known as Mohammad Ali Khan